Horn of Plenty may refer to:

 Cornucopia, a symbolic, hollow horn filled with the inexhaustible gifts of celebratory fruits
 Craterellus cornucopioides, a mushroom resembling the shape of a cornucopia
 Horn of Plenty (Warren Vaché album), 1994
 Horn of Plenty (Grizzly Bear album),  2004
 Horn of Plenty (The Remixes), a 2005 album by Grizzly Bear
 Horn of Plenty, a 1952 album by Dizzy Gillespie
 Horn of Plenty, a 1957 album by cornettist James F. Burke
 Horn of Plenty (film), a 2008 Cuban comedy film
 Horn of Plenty, the national anthem of Panem in the fictional world of The Hunger Games; see The Hunger Games (film)

See also
Plenty of Horn (disambiguation)